Thilini Pramodika Hendahewa (born 18 September 1996) is a Sri Lankan badminton player. She competed at the 2014 Summer Youth Olympics in Nanjing, China, also at the 2014 and 2018 Commonwealth Games. Hendahewa was the women' singles champion at the 2014 Sri Lanka national championships. She won her first senior international title at the 2017 Lagos International tournament in the women's singles and doubles event. Together with Kavidi Sirimannage, they claimed the gold medal in the 2019 South Asian Games. She became one of the first two Sri Lankans to win a BWF World Tour tournament, when she won the mixed doubles event alongside Sachin Dias at the 2022 Odisha Open.

Hendahewa educated applied sciences at University of Sri Jayewardenepura in Nugegoda.

Achievements

South Asian Games 
Women's doubles

Mixed doubles

BWF World Tour (1 title) 
The BWF World Tour, which was announced on 19 March 2017 and implemented in 2018, is a series of elite badminton tournaments sanctioned by the Badminton World Federation (BWF). The BWF World Tours are divided into levels of World Tour Finals, Super 1000, Super 750, Super 500, Super 300 (part of the HSBC World Tour), and the BWF Tour Super 100.

Mixed doubles

BWF International Challenge/Series (2 titles, 2 runners-up) 
Women's singles

Women's doubles

  BWF International Challenge tournament
  BWF International Series tournament
  BWF Future Series tournament

References

External links 
 

Living people
1996 births
Sportspeople from Colombo
Sri Lankan female badminton players
Badminton players at the 2014 Summer Youth Olympics
Badminton players at the 2014 Commonwealth Games
Badminton players at the 2018 Commonwealth Games
Badminton players at the 2022 Commonwealth Games
Commonwealth Games competitors for Sri Lanka
Badminton players at the 2018 Asian Games
Asian Games competitors for Sri Lanka
South Asian Games gold medalists for Sri Lanka
South Asian Games silver medalists for Sri Lanka
South Asian Games medalists in badminton